is a 2011 Japanese computer-animated film that is loosely based on the Japanese children's novel Naita Aka Oni by Hirosuke Hamada. It is directed by Takashi Yamazaki and Ryuichi Yagi. The film's script was also written by Yamazaki. SMAP member Shingo Katori and actor Koichi Yamadera voiced characters in the film.

It was released in Japanese cinemas on 17 December 2011.

Voice cast

 Shingo Katori as Naki
 Kōichi Yamadera as Gunjō
 You as Mikke
 Seishiro Kato as Konaki
 Frogman as Samurai
 Sadao Abe as Gōyan

Production
Friends: Mononoke Shima no Naki was first announced on 7 December 2010. It is directed by Takashi Yamazaki, who previously directed the 2010 film Space Battleship Yamato. Shingo Katori, Koichi Yamadera, You, Sadao Abe and Seishiro Kato were announced as the film's voice cast in the same announcement. This film is billed as a "3-D Computer Graphics (3DGC)" anime film. A 2-D version of the film will also be produced and release at the same time as the 3-D version.

The teaser and its official website for this film was launched on 20 August 2011. In the same announcement, its Japan release date was set on 17 December 2011.

Theme song
The theme song of Friends: Mononoke Shima no Naki is Smile, the theme song of the 1936 film Modern Times. This version of the song is sung by the Japanese singer MISIA.

References

External links
 
 

2010s children's fantasy films
2011 anime films
2011 computer-animated films
2011 films
Films based on fantasy novels
Films based on Japanese novels
Films directed by Takashi Yamazaki
2010s Japanese-language films
Shirogumi
Films scored by Naoki Satō